= Weird Homes Tour =

Event in the U.S.

- Status: Paused for COVID-19
- Genre: Home tours
- Frequency: Various dates
- Locations: Austin, Houston, New Orleans, Detroit, and Portland
- Country: United States
- Years active: 2014 to present
- Founders: David J. and Chelle Neff
- Website: www.weirdhomestour.com

Weird Homes Tour is an event that takes place in several cities in the United States, allowing people to tour the houses of local artists, performers, and creatives. Partial proceeds of the event are donated to local community improvement efforts. The event has taken place in Austin, Houston, New Orleans, Detroit, and Portland. Due to COVID-19 the tour has gone virtual in several cities and moved to primarily online events.

== History ==
Weird Homes Tour was founded in 2014 in Austin, Texas by husband and wife David J. Neff and Chelle Neff. It began as a curiosity for the Neffs to see what was inside of different houses in their neighborhood. While walking one night, they saw a house that looked like the Alamo and went home to see if there was any local home tour that showed neighborhood houses. Upon finding none, they decided to start their own local tour where partial profits were donated to community improvement efforts. The stated purpose of the tour is to "showcase the places that make cities fun, irreverent and strange, and to give people a glimpse into these authentic dwellings, many of them home to local artists, performers, and creatives."

The event expanded to Houston, Texas in 2016 and to New Orleans, Louisiana in 2017. It added the cities of Detroit, Michigan and Portland, Oregon in 2018. In 2018, the Neffs released Weird Homes: The People and Places That Keep Austin Strangely Wonderful, a coffee table book showcasing some of the locations from the Austin tour.

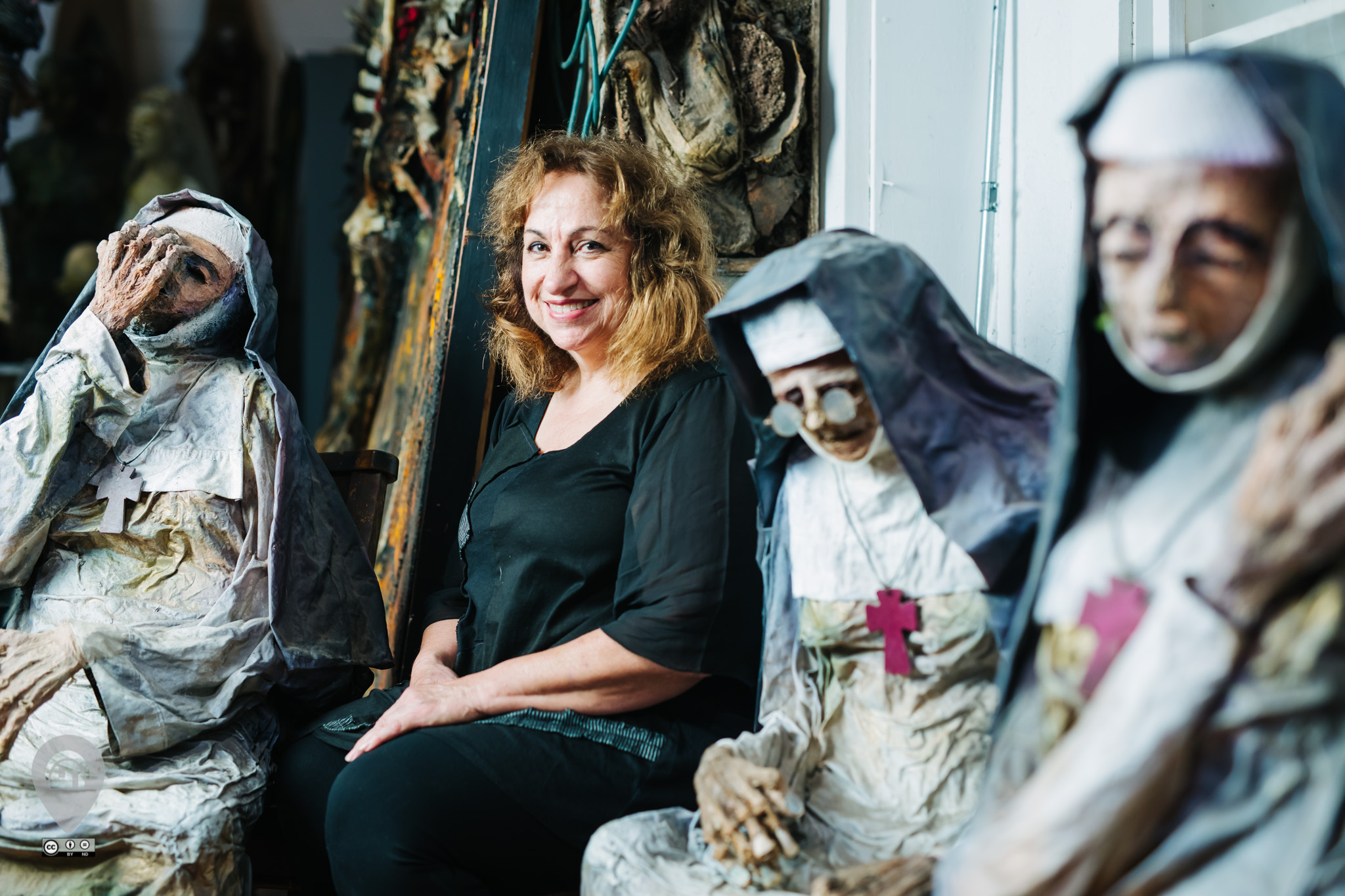
Weird Homes Tour - Sharon Kopriva’s Home 2017

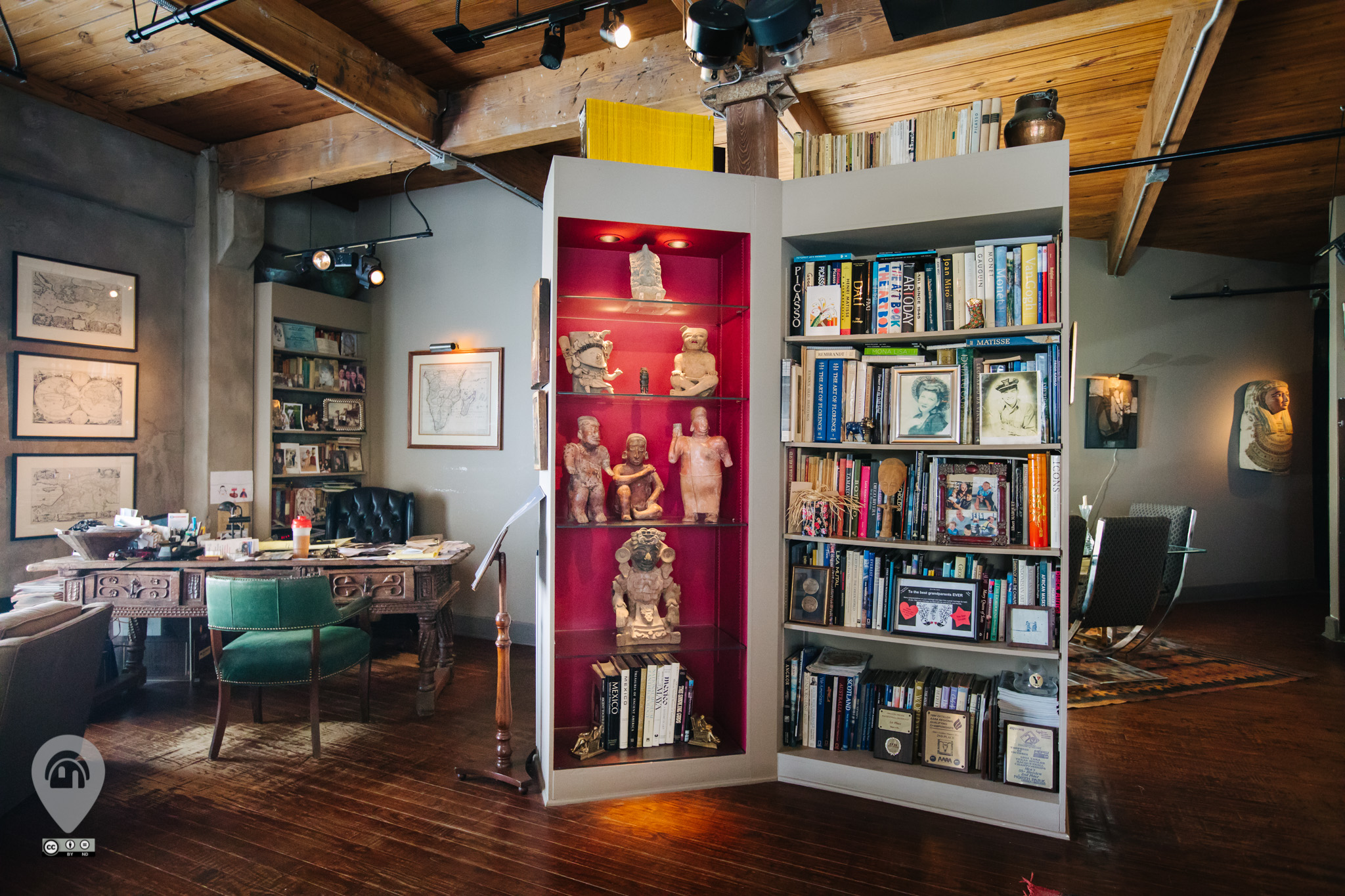
Weird Homes Tour - Susie and Dirk Stronck Home 2017
